Alfonso "Al" Martinez-Fonts Jr. is a businessperson who was the assistant secretary for the Private Sector Office at the United States Department of Homeland Security from November 2005 until April 2009, and former executive vice president of the nonprofit U.S. Chamber of Commerce foundation from October 2010 to December 2014.

Martinez-Fonts was responsible for the Private Sector Office, which provides a link between the Department of Homeland Security and the private sector of the United States.

After Martinez-Fonts left the public sector in April 2009, he founded Al Martinez-Fonts, LLC, a consulting company.

Prior to serving in the government, Martinez-Fonts was the chairman and chief executive officer for JP Morgan Chase in El Paso, Texas. Prior to this position, he was the president of a bank in San Antonio, Texas, and served as the chairman of the board of the San Antonio Chamber of Commerce in 1993. After his El Paso position he was a senior executive for Chase Bank of Texas in Houston.

Martinez-Fonts received his bachelor's degree from Villanova University in political science in 1971, and an Master of Business Administration from Long Island University focusing in finance, in 1974.

Martinez-Fonts is married to his wife Raquel. They have three children.

References 

United States Department of Homeland Security officials
Living people
1949 births
American politicians of Cuban descent
Washington, D.C., Republicans

20th-century American businesspeople